Marion County is a county located in the west central portion of the U.S. state of Georgia. As of the 2020 Census, the county had a population of 7,498. The county seat is Buena Vista. The county was created on December 14, 1827. The county was named for General Francis Marion of South Carolina.

Marion County is included in the Columbus, GA-AL Metropolitan Statistical Area.

The art site of Pasaquan is located in Marion County.

Geography

The southern half of Marion County, roughly south of Buena Vista, is located in the Kinchafoonee-Muckalee sub-basin of the ACF River Basin (Apalachicola-Chattahoochee-Flint River Basin). The northwestern portion of the county is located in the Middle Chattahoochee River-Walter F. George Lake sub-basin of the  same ACF River Basin. The majority of the northeastern portion of Marion County is located in the Middle Flint River sub-basin of the larger ACF River Basin, with just very small portions of the northeastern border, most of which is bisected by State Route 127 south of Mauk, located in the Upper Flint River sub-basin of the same larger ACF River Basin.

Major highways

  State Route 26
  State Route 30
  State Route 41
  State Route 41 Connector
  State Route 127
  State Route 137
  State Route 137 Spur
  State Route 153
  State Route 240
  State Route 240 Connector
  State Route 352
  State Route 355

Adjacent counties
 Talbot County (north)
 Taylor County (northeast)
 Schley County (east)
 Sumter County (southeast)
 Webster County (south)
 Chattahoochee County (west)

Demographics

2020 census

As of the 2020 United States census, there were 7,498 people, 3,408 households, and 2,396 families residing in the county.

2010 census
As of the 2010 United States Census, there were 8,742 people, 3,420 households, and 2,378 families living in the county. The racial makeup of the county was 60.1% white, 32.7% black or African American, 0.9% Asian, 0.5% American Indian, 0.1% Pacific islander, 4.1% from other races, and 1.6% from two or more races. Those of Hispanic or Latino origin made up 6.5% of the population. In terms of ancestry, 10.7% were Irish, 9.0% were American, 7.1% were English, and 6.7% were German.

Of the 3,420 households, 34.1% had children under the age of 18 living with them, 47.7% were married couples living together, 16.5% had a female householder with no husband present, 30.5% were non-families, and 26.9% of all households were made up of individuals. The average household size was 2.53 and the average family size was 3.05. The median age was 40.8 years.

The median income for a household in the county was $31,581 and the median income for a family was $51,000. Males had a median income of $33,626 versus $32,542 for females. The per capita income for the county was $17,729. About 15.0% of families and 22.0% of the population were below the poverty line, including 37.2% of those under age 18 and 11.3% of those age 65 or over.

2000 census
As of the census of 2000, there were 7,144 people, 2,668 households, and 1,912 families living in the county.  The population density was 20 people per square mile (8/km2).  There were 3,130 housing units at an average density of 8 per square mile (3/km2).  The racial makeup of the county was 60.85% White, 34.07% Black or African American, 0.36% Native American, 0.18% Asian, 0.17% Pacific Islander, 2.95% from other races, and 1.41% from two or more races.  5.78% of the population were Hispanic or Latino of any race.

There were 2,668 households, out of which 35.30% had children under the age of 18 living with them, 51.60% were married couples living together, 15.10% had a female householder with no husband present, and 28.30% were non-families. 24.30% of all households were made up of individuals, and 10.50% had someone living alone who was 65 years of age or older.  The average household size was 2.65 and the average family size was 3.12.

In the county, the population was spread out, with 28.30% under the age of 18, 8.60% from 18 to 24, 28.80% from 25 to 44, 23.70% from 45 to 64, and 10.50% who were 65 years of age or older.  The median age was 35 years. For every 100 females, there were 97.00 males.  For every 100 females age 18 and over, there were 92.80 males.

The median income for a household in the county was $29,145, and the median income for a family was $31,928. Males had a median income of $27,118 versus $21,211 for females. The per capita income for the county was $14,044.  About 17.80% of families and 22.40% of the population were below the poverty line, including 31.20% of those under age 18 and 25.10% of those age 65 or over.

Education
The Marion County School District contains a primary school and a secondary school that serves students from preschool to grade 12.

Communities

City
 Buena Vista (county seat)

Census-designated place
 Tazewell

Unincorporated communities
 Juniper
 Mauk

Politics
As with most Solid South counties, Marion County was dominated by the Democratic Party presidential level until 1964. Starting with the 2000s, the county has become consistently Republican at the presidential level, though by smaller margins than many rural counties in Georgia.

See also

 National Register of Historic Places listings in Marion County, Georgia
List of counties in Georgia

References

 
Georgia (U.S. state) counties
Columbus metropolitan area, Georgia
1827 establishments in Georgia (U.S. state)
Populated places established in 1827